The 2019–20 Dutch Basketball League (DBL) was the 60th season of the Dutch Basketball League, the highest professional basketball league in the Netherlands. The regular season started on 28 September. 

On 12 March 2020, the season was postponed until 31 March because of the COVID-19 pandemic. On 14 March, the DBL announced to suspend the competition to at least 2 May. On 20 March, the DBL cancelled the rest of the season while naming no champion. Landstede Hammers qualified for the Basketball Champions League (BCL) based on the standings at the time.

Format changes
From this season, the DBL adopted FIBA's home-grown players rule. Teams need to have at least 4 (for a 10-man roster) or 5 (for a 12-man roster) home-grown players on their roster. Due to this new rule, the previous limitation of maximum five foreign players, is dropped.

Teams

On 4 May 2019, the DBL announced all nine teams from the last season would return, excluding Dutch Windmills which was dissolved. TBG Dragons from Nijmegen was planning to make its debut season, depending on the club being able to meet all license requirements. On 28 June, the DBL announced the Dragons withdrew.

Arenas and locations
{| class="wikitable sortable"  
|-
! Club
! Location
! Venue
! Capacity
|-
| Apollo Amsterdam || Amsterdam || Apollohal  || align=center | 1,500
|-
| Aris Leeuwarden || Leeuwarden ||  Kalverdijkje || align=center | 1,700
|-
| BAL || Weert || Sporthal Boshoven || align=center | 1,000
|-
|  Den Helder Suns || Den Helder || Sporthal Sportlaan || align=center |1,000
|-
|  Donar || Groningen || MartiniPlaza  || align=center | 4,350
|-
|  Heroes Den Bosch || 's-Hertogenbosch || Maaspoort  || align=center | 2,800
|-
|  Feyenoord || Rotterdam || Topsportcentrum Rotterdam || align=center | 1,000
|-
|  Landstede Hammers || Zwolle || Landstede Sportcentrum || align=center | 1,200
|-
| ZZ Leiden || Leiden || Vijf Meihal || align=center | 2,000
|}

Personnel and sponsorship

Coaching changes

Regular season

League table

Results

Dutch clubs in European competitions

See also
2019–20 Dutch Basketball Cup
2019 Dutch Basketball Supercup

Notes

References

Dutch Basketball League seasons
1
Netherlands
Dutch